He Died with His Eyes Open (original title: On ne meurt que deux fois) is a 1985 French erotic neo-noir thriller film directed by Jacques Deray. It was based on the 1984 English-language novel He Died with His Eyes Open by Derek Raymond. It starred Charlotte Rampling and Michel Serrault. The film won the César Award for Best Cinematography. Charlotte Rampling and Michel Serrault were nominated for César Award for Best Actor and Actress.

Plot 
Charly Berliner, a pianist, is found dead beside a railway track. The inspector in charge of the investigation, Robert Staniland, arrives at the victim's home to search for clues. As he listens to the tapes recorded by Berliner in which he confesses his love for a mysterious woman named Barbara, the latter turns up unexpectedly and confesses to the crime.

Cast 
 Michel Serrault as Inspector Robert Staniland
 Charlotte Rampling as Barbara Spark
 Xavier Deluc as Marc Spark
 Élisabeth Depardieu as Margo Berliner
 Jean-Paul Roussillon as Léonce
 Jean-Pierre Darroussin as Moulard
 Julie Jézéquel as Sophie
 Albert Delpy as Forensic scientist
 Riton Liebman as Éric Berliner
 Gérard Darmon as Jean-Loup Soeren
 Jean-Pierre Bacri as The barman

Accolades

References

External links 
 

1985 films
French crime thriller films
French mystery films
1980s French-language films
French crime drama films
French erotic drama films
1980s crime drama films
Films based on British novels
Films directed by Jacques Deray
Incest in film
Political thriller films
French neo-noir films
French detective films
1980s erotic thriller films
1980s erotic drama films
1985 drama films
Films scored by Claude Bolling
Films with screenplays by Michel Audiard
1980s French films